Frederick Codd (born 1832 in East Dereham) was a British Gothic Revival architect and speculative builder who designed and built many Victorian houses in North Oxford, England.

Born in 1832 in East Dereham in Norfolk., he was initially based in London but he was active in Oxford by 1865.

He was a pupil of William Wilkinson, another North Oxford architect, and their styles are similar. He designed houses on the west side of Banbury Road, in Bradmore Road, Canterbury Road, Crick Road and Norham Gardens,  amongst other locations.

In central Oxford, Codd designed shops and offices in King Edward Street south of the High Street during 1871–75 for Oriel College. He is also involved in the rebuilding of Queen Street during 1875–78.

Woodperry House in Oxfordshire was enlarged in 1879–80 when the porch and two pedimented wings were added, designed by Codd, then an assistant of Sir Thomas Jackson. He lost the competition to build the Oxford High School for Boys in George Street to Jackson.

In Oxford, Codd initially lived in Cowley Road. Later, in 1867, he moved to a semi-detached villa of his own design at 39 Banbury Road, on the corner with Bevington Road. In September 1876, Codd was forced into liquidation due to difficulty in selling large houses in Canterbury Road, with debts to the Oxford and Abingdon Building Society.

Codd succeeded Samuel Lipscomb Seckham as the City Surveyor in Oxford.

See also
 List of Oxford architects

References

Sources

1832 births
Year of death missing
People from Dereham
19th-century English architects
Architects from Norfolk
Gothic Revival architects
Architects from Oxford